Charlene Wong (born March 4, 1966) is a Canadian former competitive figure skater. She is the 1981 NHK Trophy bronze medalist and competed at the 1988 Winter Olympics. She currently works as a figure skating coach.

Personal life
Charlene Wong was born on March 4, 1966, in Montreal. She has two older siblings, a brother and sister.

Career
Wong was coached from her early years by Helen Ann Shields and also received lessons from Tommy Litz, Barbara Roles, Kathy Casey, and Osborne Colson. In 1986, she joined Peter Dunfield and Sonya Dunfield who would coach her until 1990.

Wong won five medals at the Canadian Championships — four silver and one bronze. She was selected to compete at the 1988 Winter Olympics in Calgary and finished 13th. She retired from competition in 1990.

Wong became a coach in the United States. She has coached the following skaters:
 Victoria Muniz 
 Amber Corwin
 Mirai Nagasu
 Caroline Zhang

Results

References

External links

1966 births
Canadian female single skaters
Canadian figure skating coaches
Canadian sportspeople of Chinese descent
Figure skaters at the 1988 Winter Olympics
Living people
Olympic figure skaters of Canada
Figure skaters from Montreal
Female sports coaches